Still Brook Waterfall is a waterfall at mouth of Still Brook, where the brook empties into Black Brook Cove, and so into the Cabot Strait and the Atlantic Ocean. The larger Black Brook also enters the cove, at the southern end of the beach.

References

Waterfalls of Nova Scotia